Gene  Norman Weingarten (born October 2, 1951) is an American journalist, and former syndicated humor columnist for The Washington Post. He is the only two-time winner of the Pulitzer Prize for Feature Writing. Weingarten is known for both his serious and humorous work. Through September 2021, Weingarten's column, "Below the Beltway," was published weekly in The Washington Post magazine and syndicated nationally by The Washington Post Writers Group, which also syndicates Barney & Clyde, a comic strip he co-authors with his son, Dan Weingarten, with illustrations by David Clark.

Early life and education 
Gene Norman Weingarten was born on October 2, 1951, in New York City. He grew up in the southwest Bronx, the son of an accountant who worked as an Internal Revenue Service agent and a schoolteacher. In 1968, Weingarten graduated from The Bronx High School of Science and attended New York University, where he started as a pre-med student but ended up majoring in psychology. He was editor of the NYU daily student newspaper, The Heights Daily News. Weingarten left college three credits short of a degree.

Career 
In 1972, while still in college, Weingarten's story about gangs in the South Bronx was published as a cover story in New York Magazine.

Weingarten's first newspaper job was with the Albany, New York, Knickerbocker News, an afternoon daily.

In 1977, he went to work at the Detroit Free Press. Weingarten then moved back to New York City to work at The National Law Journal.

From 1981 to 1990, Weingarten was editor of the Miami Herald Sunday magazine, Tropic. In 1984, he hired Dave Barry, giving one of America's best-known humor columnists his big break. Tropic won two Pulitzer Prizes, including Barry's, during Weingarten's tenure. In 1984 he created the Herald Hunt, along with Barry and his current editor at the Washington Post, Tom Shroder, whom he refers to frequently in his online chats as "Tom the Butcher".

The Washington Post 
In 1990, Weingarten was hired by The Washington Post.

Weingarten wrote "Below the Beltway," a weekly humor column for The Washington Post that was nationally syndicated. Illustrator Eric Shansby contributed drawings to the column, which has been a long-term collaboration over 10 years.

Weingarten created and, until 2003, edited The Style Invitational humor contest for The Washington Post. As part of the contest, he often hid his connection to the Invitational, using the pseudonym "The Czar." However, Weingarten admitted responsibility in 1999, writing, "I run a reader-participation contest every Sunday in The Post. It is called The Style Invitational." He claimed credit again in 2001, acknowledging that he was editor of The Style Invitational.

In 2005, one of Weingarten's in-house critiques was leaked online, where he said The Post was suffering a failure of imagination. Selected passages were later re-posted on his column.

Weingarten hosted a popular Washington Post online chat called "Chatological Humor," formerly known as "Tuesdays with Moron." Common topics in his online chat include the art of comic strips, analysis of humor, politics, philosophy, medicine, and gender differences. Many of his columns addressing gender differences have been written in a he-said, she-said style in collaboration with humorist Gina Barreca, his co-author for I'm with Stupid. It was during one of these chats he coined the phrase "Marrying Irving.". His last chat at the Post was November 3, 2020, where he revealed that Chatalogical Humor had been cancelled, partially or wholly due to his public criticism of the Post's rollout of their new online chat software the previous week.

In 2007, for one of his "Below the Beltway" columns, he humorously enhanced his Wikipedia entry until he was caught and the edits reverted.

In his live online chat on June 22, 2009, Weingarten disclosed that he had accepted a buyout offer from The Washington Post, which meant he was retiring as a longer-form feature writer. The frequency of his online chat was reduced from weekly to monthly, although he provides weekly updates. His column will continue under a contract with The Post but he will no longer contribute feature-length articles. , he was semi-retired from the paper, working on other projects.

In the September 26, 2021 Washington Post Magazine, he wrote his last humor column titled “The Short Goodbye.”, and in a followup comment, noted that he was not retiring, just discontinuing his regular column. However, Gene announced via Twitter on December 8, 2021, that he and the Post could not come to terms on a new contract, and he was no longer writing for them. His final story was "A Dog’s Life: Why are so many people so cruel to their dogs? My search to understand a hidden scourge".

The Hypochondriac's Guide To Life. And Death 
Weingarten is a self-acknowledged hypochondriac. He was diagnosed with what was then a near-fatal infection of Hepatitis C, which led to the publication his first book, 1998's The Hypochondriac's Guide To Life. And Death.

I'm with Stupid: One Man, One Woman 
Weingarten cowrote a series of humor columns in The Washington Post with feminist writer Gina Barreca about the differences between men and women. These became the basis of the 2004 book she and Weingarten collaborated on called I'm with Stupid: One Man. One Woman. 10,000 Years Of Misunderstandings Between The Sexes Cleared Right Up. The two wrote for over two years via email and on the phone without having met in person. They eventually met for the first time while doing publicity for the book. The book is illustrated by cartoonist Richard Thompson.

Old Dogs: Are the Best Dogs 
In fall of 2008, Weingarten published Old Dogs: Are the Best Dogs in collaboration with photographer Michael S. Williamson. Together they profiled and photographed 63 dogs between the ages of 10 and 17 years old over the course of two and a half years. In response to the inevitable question of which dogs remained alive, Weingarten has asserted that the answer will always be "all of them." Weingarten's inspiration for Old Dogs came shortly after the death of his dog, Harry S Truman, who is also featured in the book.

Barney & Clyde 
In June 2010, Weingarten and his son Dan began publishing the syndicated comic strip Barney & Clyde, illustrated by David Clark. The comic is about the friendship between billionaire, J. Barnard Pillsbury, and a homeless man named Clyde Finster. The comic took over five years to develop, with the Miami Herald, The Washington Post, and the Chicago Tribune early supporters.

Me & Dog 
In September 2014, Weingarten published Me & Dog, a picture book, in collaboration with illustrator Eric Shansby. The book is about a young boy Sid and his dog, Murphy. It is said to be the first atheist-themed children's book. Weingarten said he wrote the book in response to the lack of literature geared towards children and atheism − and a counterbalance to the prevalence of books like Heaven Is for Real.

One Day 

In October 2019 Weingarten published One Day, an exhaustive look into a random day in American history.  The date was chosen by children picking numbers out of a hat: It was December 28, 1986. The premise was that if you dig deeply enough, there is no such thing as an ordinary day. In 2019, it was ranked by Slate as one of the 50 best nonfiction books of the past 25 years.

Substack 
In Janary 2023, Gene resumed his chat (now twice-weekly, on Tuesdays and Thursdays) on the Substack publishing website, now entitled "The Gene Pool". It is free to read, but participation requires a subscription ($50 per year).

Other work 
Weingarten has written three screenplays, one in collaboration with humorist Dave Barry and two in collaboration with David Simon, including B Major, about a piano marathon conducted in Scranton in 1970. None of the screenplays has yet been produced.

Awards 
From 1987 to 1988, Weingarten was a fellow at the Nieman Foundation for Journalism at Harvard University.

In 2006, Weingarten won the Missouri Lifestyle Journalism Award for Multicultural Journalism for his Washington Post Magazine feature article Snowbound.

In 2008, Weingarten was awarded the Pulitzer Prize for Feature Writing for his Washington Post story, "Pearls Before Breakfast," "his chronicling of a world-class violinist (Joshua Bell) who, as an experiment, played beautiful music in a subway station filled with unheeding commuters." The night Weingarten returned from accepting his Pulitzer Prize, he received an email from a librarian named Paul Musgrave from the Richard Nixon Presidential Library, who told him that he had recently seen an article about a similar experiment that the Chicago Evening Post did in May 1930 where they had the virtuoso Jacques Gordon play his Stradivarius violin outside a subway station to see if commuters would notice the music. The article, entitled "Famous Fiddler in Disguise Gets $5.61 in Curb Concerts," showed commuters displaying the same disinterest as Weingarten described in his article. It turns out Joshua Bell had owned that same Stradivarius violin for over 10 years.

In 2010, Weingarten was awarded a second Pulitzer Prize for Feature Writing for his Washington Post story, "Fatal Distraction," "his haunting story about parents, from varying walks of life, who accidentally kill their children by forgetting them in cars." Weingarten said he had a lucky break when his daughter was younger when he almost left her behind in the car when they lived in Florida.

In 2014, Weingarten was awarded the National Society of Newspaper Columnists' Ernie Pyle Lifetime Achievement Award.

Personal life 
Weingarten has lived in many places on the East Coast, but as he and his family settled in the Washington, D.C., area, they lived for a time in Bethesda, Maryland. Since 2001 he has lived in the Capitol Hill neighborhood of Washington, D.C., with his wife, Arlene Reidy, an attorney, but in a column published August 10, 2017, announced that the marriage had collapsed. He has since made several references to a girlfriend in online chats, and at least one column, and in his chat of June 2, 2019, revealed that his girlfriend was Rachel Manteuffel, a 36-year-old editor and fellow writer for the Washington Post. He has two children, Molly Weingarten, a veterinarian, and Dan Weingarten, a cartoonist.

Weingarten has stated he is an atheist. He is an amateur horologist.

Controversy 
On August 19, 2021, Weingarten published a column in The Washington Post titled "You can’t make me eat these foods". The column outlines many foods Weingarten dislikes, including hazelnuts, sweet pickles, and "Indian food." It stated that Indian food is "the only ethnic cuisine in the world based entirely on one spice." Padma Lakshmi shared the article and criticized both Weingarten and The Washington Post for publishing content with racist undertones. Celebrities of South Asian descent Meena Harris, Mindy Kaling and Salman Rushdie also publicly criticized the piece.

On August 23, the Post appended a correction to the top of the original article piece:  “A previous version of this article incorrectly stated that Indian cuisine is based on one spice, curry, and that Indian food is made up only of curries, types of stew. In fact, India’s vastly diverse cuisines use many spice blends and include many other types of dishes. The article has been corrected.”

Works and publications 
 Books
 
 
 
 
 
 

 Selected articles

See also 
 Barney & Clyde

References

Further reading

External links 

 
 Gene Weingarten at The Washington Post
 

1951 births
American atheists
American columnists
American humorists
American male journalists
American newspaper editors
Detroit Free Press people
Living people
New York University alumni
Nieman Fellows
Pulitzer Prize for Feature Writing winners
The Bronx High School of Science alumni
The Washington Post people
Miami Herald people